Kokšov-Bakša is a village and municipality in Košice-okolie District in the Kosice Region of eastern Slovakia.

History
Historically, the village was first mentioned in 1262.

Geography
It has a population of about 1050 people.

Genealogical resources

The records for genealogical research are available at the state archive "Statny Archiv in Kosice, Slovakia"

 Roman Catholic church records (births/marriages/deaths): 1787-1896 (parish B)

See also
 List of municipalities and towns in Slovakia

External links

Surnames of living people in KoksovBaksa

Villages and municipalities in Košice-okolie District